Xylena is a genus of moths of the family Noctuidae.

Species

 Xylena apicimacula Yoshimoto, 1993
 Xylena brucei – Bruce's swordgrass (Smith, 1892)
 Xylena buckwelli Rungs, 1952
 Xylena changi Horie, 1993
 Xylena cineritia – gray swordgrass (Grote, 1874)
 Xylena confusa Kononenko & Ronkay, 1998
 Xylena curvimacula – dot-and-dash swordgrass (Morrison, 1874)
 Xylena exsoleta – sword-grass (Linnaeus, 1758)
 Xylena formosa (Butler, 1878)
 Xylena fumosa (Butler, 1878)
 Xylena lunifera (Warren, 1010)
 Xylena nepalina Yoshimoto, 1993
 Xylena nihonica (Hoene, 1917)
 Xylena nupera – American swordgrass (Lintner, 1874)
 Xylena plumbeopaca Hreblay & Ronkay, 2000
 Xylena sugii Kobayashi, 1993
 Xylena tanabei Owada, 1993
 Xylena tatajiana Chang, 1991
 Xylena thoracica – acadian swordgrass (Putnam-Cramer, 1886)
 Xylena vetusta – red sword-grass (Hübner, [1813])

References
 Natural History Museum Lepidoptera genus database
 Xylena at funet.fi

External links
 

Cuculliinae
Taxa named by Ferdinand Ochsenheimer